Ashley James may refer to:

Ashley James (curator), American curator
Celebrity Big Brother (British series 21)#Ashley James, Celebrity Big Brother contestant